Robert Anderst is a politician who served as a member of Idaho House of Representatives from 2012 to 2020. Anderst announced he would not run for re-election in 2020.

Early life and education 
Anderst was born in Pocatello, Idaho. In 1992, he earned an associates degree in business management and marketing from Idaho State University.

Career 
Anderst is a Lobbyist with Risch Pisca PLLC. He also is a commercial real estate broker and owner of the Anderst Company in Boise, Idaho  
https://www.linkedin.com/in/robert-anderst-0904771ab

On November 6, 2012, Anderst won the election and became a Republican member of Idaho House of Representatives for District 12, seat A. Anderst defeated Tracy S. Volpi with 67.1% of the votes. On November 4, 2014, as an incumbent, Anderst won the election and continued serving District 12, seat A. Anderst defeated Maria Gonzalez Mabbutt with 69.0% of the votes. On November 8, 2016, as an incumbent, Anderst won the election and continued serving District 12, seat A. Anderst defeated Maria Gonzalez Mabbutt with 68.5% of the votes. On November 6, 2018, as an incumbent, Anderst won the election and continued serving District 12, seat A. Anderst defeated Pat Day Hartwell with 64.0% of the votes.

Election history

Personal life 
Anderst's wife is Amy Anderst. He has two adult children. Anderst and his family live in Nampa, Idaho.

References

External links
 Robert Anderst at the Idaho Legislature
 Archive Campaign Site
 Biography at Ballotpedia
 Financial information (state office) at the National Institute for Money in State Politics

Year of birth missing (living people)
Living people
Idaho State University alumni
Republican Party members of the Idaho House of Representatives
People from Nampa, Idaho
People from Pocatello, Idaho
21st-century American politicians